Lancashire Life is a British monthly regional magazine, first published in 1947, devoted to the English county palatine of Lancashire. The magazine is part of  Archant Life Ltd. It covers lifestyle topics including motoring, property, food, art and everyday life in the county. In 2015 it was awarded the Prolific North Awards in the magazines category.

Circulation
Audited circulation was reported as being 163,996 copies for the period 1 January to 31 December 2006. It was 20,199 copies monthly for 2014.

In 2019, monthly readership was 35,093.

References

External links
Lancashire Life website

1947 establishments in England
Lifestyle magazines published in the United Kingdom
Monthly magazines published in the United Kingdom
Furness
Local interest magazines published in the United Kingdom
Magazines established in 1947
Mass media in Lancashire
Mass media in Greater Manchester
Mass media in Merseyside